The 1997 Canadian National Soccer League season was the seventy-fifth season for the Canadian National Soccer League. The season began on June 4, 1997, and concluded on October 8, 1997, with St. Catharines Roma Wolves defeating Toronto Supra in a two-game series for the CNSL Championship. While the league cup was awarded to Toronto Supra due to several irregularities on behave of Kosova Albanians.   

The season was noteworthy with the return of Toronto Croatia, and Hamilton White Eagles after the Canadian International Soccer League (Puma League) decided to merge with the CNSL. A notable departure was Toronto Italia a well-distinguished club that had another opportunity in 1998 to return to the professional scene but failed to settle disputes regarding territory and league policy. The league operated as a private league for the final time, and under the banner of the CNSL as it reconciled its relationship with the Ontario Soccer Association in 1998. The following season it would operate as the Canadian Professional Soccer League sanctioned by the Ontario Soccer Association to implement the Image of the Game report to provide a suitable professional soccer structure in Ontario and potentially throughout the country.

Overview

Summary  
The number of clubs participating in the 1997 season remained at seven with several notable additions and departures. The additions revolved around the merger between the Canadian International Soccer League (Puma League) and the Canadian National Soccer League (CNSL) which enabled the CNSL to replace the departing clubs. The merger marked the return of Toronto Croatia, Hamilton White Eagles, along with the addition of Kosova Albanians as a new entry. The Caribbean Stars opted against joining the CNSL as it lacked the financial resources to compete in the league. The departing clubs were Oakville Canadian Western while Scarborough Astros merged with North York Talons and played their home matches in North York, and Scarborough. 

A notable absentee was Toronto Italia an entity with a historical significance in Canadian soccer. The departure stemmed from a variety of issues originally with the Ontario Soccer Association's decision to decertify the CNSL, and a feud involving Toronto Croatia over an alleged debt from the 1995 season.  As the USISL A-League expanded to include the Toronto Lynx the CNSL began to automatically serve as an unofficial feeder system with Italia's head coach Peter Pinizzotto, and several CNSL players being recruited to the Lynx's inaugural roster. The league would ultimately receive this official recognition in the 2002 season under its successor league as both parties would form a player exchange program. Throughout the regular season, controversies abounded as a league meeting was convened in the final quarter of the season, which resulted in the suspension of Hamilton, and North York for the remainder of the season. The primary reason for their suspension revolved around the harassment of match officials, and unpaid league fees and fines. The league meeting also produced a revised schedule where the final five matches were canceled, which allowed the remaining clubs a berth in the postseason.

Teams

Final standings

Playoffs

First round 

Series tied 1–1. Kosova wins two 15 minute half mini game 1–0 to win tiebreaker.

Semifinals

Toronto Supra wins series 2 games to 0.

St. Catharines Roma Wolves wins series 1 game to 0 (with draw).

Finals

St. Catharines won 4–3 on aggregate.

Cup 
The cup tournament was a separate contest from the rest of the season, in which all seven teams took part. All the matches were separate from the regular season. Teams played each other once home and away in the Cup competition, and the first-place team would win the Cup competition.   

Originally Kosova won the tournament after finishing first in the standings as a result of a greater goal differential. Shortly after league executives ordered a single finals match to determine the champion. The decision was influenced after Kosova's president was required to provide a performance cheque for a player who was involved in an altercation with a referee in an earlier match. League executive Michael Di Biase reported that the club officials failed in properly address the request. Though Toronto Croatia finished with similar results they were disqualified after using an ineligible player. As Hamilton, and North York was suspended from league play the suspension also included their participation in the cup tournament.   

In the postseason semifinal match against St. Catharines Roma Wolves, the game was delayed when Kosova's president declared his club as cup champions after presenting a trophy to Kosova. Consequently, the league officials canceled the final match and automatically declared Toronto Supra as league cup champions. In response to the decision, Kosova protested the league's actions and subsequently withdrew from the CNSL.

Standings

Matches

References

External links
RSSSF CNSL page
thecnsl.com - 1997 season

1997 domestic association football leagues
Canadian National Soccer League
1997